Jean-Marcellin Buttin (born 16 December 1991) is a French rugby union player for Bordeaux in the Top 14. He plays as a Fullback.

Biography 
Trained first at RC Metz then in Dijon, he joined ASM Clermont Auvergne in 2009 where he played with the junior team. On 21 January 2011 he played his first professional match against Saracens in the Heineken Cup. He made his French international debut as a first half replacement for Clément Poitrenaud in the Six Nations loss to Wales on 17 March 2012.

External links
 

1991 births
Living people
French rugby union players
ASM Clermont Auvergne players
Sportspeople from Metz
Rugby union fullbacks
France international rugby union players